Toca is a town and municipality in the Colombian Department of Boyacá, part of the subregion of the Central Boyacá Province. It borders Tuta in the north, Siachoque in the south, Pesca in the east and Tuta and Chivatá in the west.

History 
Before the Spanish conquest of the central highlands of the Colombian Andes, the area was inhabited by the Muisca people, organized in a loose confederation of different rulers. Toca was reigned by the iraca of Sugamuxi, present-day Sogamoso. The troops of conquistador Gonzalo Jiménez de Quesada entered the Altiplano Cundiboyacense in 1537. The year of foundation of modern Toca is not entirely clear, but set at 1555 by Pedro Ruíz García.

Etymology 
In the Chibcha language of the Muisca, Toca means "Domain of the river".

Economy 
The economy of Toca is based on agriculture and livestock farming, with a small mining (salt) part. Main agricultural products are wheat, potatoes, maize, barley, peas, beans, apples, pears, peaches, curubas and cherries.

Gallery

References 

Municipalities of Boyacá Department
Populated places established in 1555
1555 establishments in the Spanish Empire
Muisca Confederation
Muysccubun